This is a list of scheduled monuments in Cornwall, United Kingdom. Monuments are listed by Historic England as part of the National Heritage List for England. For the scope of this list, the Isles of Sicily are included and the ceremonial county boundaries are used.

This list is incomplete, more monuments may be included in Category:Scheduled monuments in Cornwall.

Scheduled monuments 
Greystone Bridge
Kelly Rounds
Madron Well and Madron Well Chapel
Penstowe Castle
Perran Round
Restormel Castle
Sperris Quoit
Treen Cliff
Warbstow Bury

Owned by the Duchy
Sites owned by the Duchy of Cornwall and managed by English Heritage. The Duchy also owns scheduled monuments in Devon, Dorset, and Hertfordshire.

 Hurlers Stone Circles, St Cleer
 Launceston Castle, Launceston
 Restormel Castle, Lostwithiel
 Tintagel Castle, TIntagel

Scilly
 Bants Carn Burial Chamber and Halangy Down Ancient Village, St Mary's, Isles of Scilly
 Innisidgen, St Mary's, Isles of Scilly
 Porth Hellick Down, St Mary's, Isles of Scilly
 The Garrison Walls, St Mary's, Isles of Scilly
 Harry’s Walls, St Mary's, Isles of Scilly
 Cromwell's Castle, Tresco, Isles of Scilly
 King Charles's Castle, Tresco, Isles of Scilly
 The Old Blockhouse, Tresco, Isles of Scilly

NHLE
These place-names are taken directly from searching the NHLE, you can help by adding their common names. The numbers are each sites NHLE reference number. The full list in this section should contain 1346 entries.
 Round with annexe 530m north east of Lower Padreda – 1003076
 Bowl barrow 70m north east of Killarney – 1003083
 Bowl barrow 480m south of Traboe Cross forming part of a round barrow cemetery on Goonhilly Downs – 1003089
 Hut circle settlement 950yds (870m) NW of Gwenter Farm – 1003102
 Boslow Cross 550yds (500m) NW of Boslow Farm – 1003110
 Part of the mining complex at Wheal Grenville and East Wheal Grenville Mines 210 north west of Newton Moor Farm – 1003117
 Bowl barrow 680m north west of Trewithick Farm – 1003272
 Hut circle 280yds (250m) SW of Trevarthen – 1001725
 Hut circle 440yds (400m) SW of Candra – 1004222
 Ring cairn 295m north west of Candra – 1004223
 Three bowl barrows between 120m and 820m south of Brynn Barton Cottage – 1004231
 Round 750m north east of Trelaske House – 1004237
 Wayside cross 95m WSW of Trelaske House – 1004238
 Iron Age defended settlement 425m west of Trebray – 1004240
 Two batteries and part of a third at Maker Heights called Redoubt No1, Redoubt No2 and Redoubt No3 – 1004254
 Round 450yds (405m) NW of Lower Chellew Farm – 1004262
 Round 220m south east of The Level House – 1004270
 Hut circle on Carnyorth Common 200yds (180m) W of Carn Kenidjack – 1004278
 Hut circles with associated field system 400yds (360m) SW of Little Higher Bosullow – 1004316
 Round barrow 400yds (370m) NW of Traboe Cross – 1004323
 Courtyard house 280m north west of Middle Carnaquidden – 1004353
 Chapel at Hall – 1004361
 Medieval chapel in the grounds of Shillingham Manor – 1004363
 Two bowl barrows 570m south west of Polkerth forming part of a larger round barrow cemetery on Goonhilly Downs – 1004374
 Motte castle 80m north west of the church at Week St Mary – 1004386
 Kerbed cairn 100m NNW of Chapel Carn Brea – 1004389
 Three bowl barrows 350m north of Poldhu Cove – 1004396
 Wayside cross at Trengwainton Carn – 1004412
 Courtyard house settlement and field system and medieval farmstead 440m south of Bosporthennis Farm Cottage – 1004421
 Stone hut circle settlement with irregular aggregate field system at Kynance Gate, 935m south east of Kynance Farm – 1004432
 Three bowl barrows 215m south east of Beech Lawn, which form part of a larger round barrow cemetery – 1004433
 Bowl barrow 230m south west of Middle Taphouse Farm, forming part of a round barrow cemetery – 1004435
 Two bowl barrows 190m east of Zacry's Islands – 1004461
 Rectangular camp SW of Trevarnon Round – 1004468
 Bowl barrow 875m SSE of Bodrugan Barton – 1004470
 Three bowl barrows 500m SSW of Leech Pool forming part of a round barrow cemetery on Goonhilly Downs -1004471
 Kerbed cairn called Hangman's Barrow – 1001728
 Round cairn and kerbed cairn 300m north east of Blackrock Farm – 1001729
 Cast iron footbridge at Perran Mill – 1001726
 Round cairn 185m NNW of Old Hilltop Farm – 1001727
 Bowl barrow 540m WSW of St Breock Downs Farm – 1004478
 Enclosed stone hut circle settlement and part of a field system 400m north of Bodrifty Farm – 1004481
 Standing stone called Tresvennack Pillar – 1004492
 Two large regular stone circles 290m north east of Hailglower Farm – 1004493
 Part of Launceston Priory 50m south-east of St Thomas' Church – 1004511
 Three bowl barrows 570m north east of Trewindle – 1004617
 Three bowl barrows 160m west of Little Hendra – 1004621
 Promontory fort called The Rumps – 1004625
 Standing stone 815m west of St Breock Downs Farm – 1004653
 Two bowl barrows, one 220m east of Lower Longbeak and the other 320m east of Higher Longbeak – 1001723
 Megalithic tomb 220yds (200m) SW of Trevarthen – 1001724
 Two bowl barrows 250m west of Silverwell Farm – 1001730
 Bowl barrow 270m south west of Castle Hill Farm – 1005451
 Barrow group on Greenbarrow Downs – 1005458
 Three barrows 550m ENE of Cansford – 1005463
 Barrow 90m E of Trelay Farm – 1005466
 Wayside Cross at Camborne Park Recreation Ground – 1003049
 Two bowl barrows 70m north west and 50m south east of Tor View at Middle Taphouse – 1003077
 Bowl barrow 430m south west of Fairy Cross Farm forming part of a round barrow cemetery – 1003081
 Deserted medieval settlement with 16th and 18th century structures 85m west of West Lanyon Quoit – 1003084
 Part of an early-Christian cemetery 65m north west of Tintagel church – 1003086
 Three bowl barrows forming part of a round barrow cemetery at Cataclews Point – 1003088
 Wayside cross on Druid's Hill, 350m south east of Bodmin Lodge – 1006633
 Three wayside crosses 235m south east of Bosvathick – 1006665
 Wayside cross 240m north west of Higher Predannack Farm – 1006668
 Wayside cross at Nanjarrow – 1006676
 Prehistoric inhumation cemetery at Harlyn – 1006685
 Small multivallate hillfort called Castle Dore – 1006691
 Neolithic hilltop enclosure with later settlement and defensive structures, a prehistoric field system, a medieval castle and deer park and mineral workings on Carn Brea – 1006704
 Enclosed stone hut circle settlement at Chygwidden Vean, 250m east of Land Vue – 1006715
 Promontory fort known as Treryn Dinas – 1006733
 Promontory fort at Chynalls Point – 1003103
 Courtyard house settlement with enclosure and fogou 235m south east of Porthmeor Farm – 1003071
 Wayside cross at Nanquidno Farm – 1003109
 Boskednan stone circle: Large regular stone circle known as the 'Nine Maidens' and a round cairn 690m north-west of Killiow Farm – 1006738
 Portal dolmen known as 'The Three Brothers of Grugith' – 1006746
 Boswens Menhir, also known as the Long Stone, 180m north of Halvanance Farm – 1006749
 Standing stone 200yds (180m) W of Chycarne – 1003116
 Ring bank in the NW corner of Lewannick Plantation – 1003118
 Two bowl barrows 385m south east of Higher Tregolls – 1003273

References

Cornwall
Buildings and structures in Cornwall